The 2003 Pro Bowl was the NFL's all-star game for the 2002 season. The game was played on February 2, 2003, at Aloha Stadium in Honolulu, Hawaii. The final Score was AFC 45, NFC 20. Ricky Williams of the Miami Dolphins was the game's MVP.

AFC roster

Offense

Defense

Special teams

NFC roster

Offense

Defense

Special teams

Number of selections per team

Notes:
Replacement selection due to injury or vacancy
Injured player; selected but did not play
Replacement starter; selected as reserve
"Need player"; named by coach

References

External links
2003 Pro Bowl recap on ProBowlOnline.com

Pro Bowl
Pro Bowl
Pro Bowl
Pro Bowl
Pro Bowl
American football competitions in Honolulu
February 2003 sports events in the United States